Orthomegas fragosoi is a species of beetle in the family Cerambycidae. It is found in Guatemala, Nicaragua, Costa Rica and Panama.

References

Beetles described in 1993
Prioninae